Rhenium(III) bromide is a chemical compound with the formula Re3Br9. It is a black lustrous crystalline solid. This compound reacts with water to form rhenium(IV) oxide and is isostructural with rhenium(III) chloride.

Preparation
This compound is prepared by the reaction of rhenium metal and bromine gas at 500 °C under nitrogen:
6Re + 9Br2 → 2Re3Br9
If there is oxygen in the atmosphere, it will instead form rhenium(III) oxybromide.

However, the most common method of producing this compound is by first reacting potassium hexabromorhenate(IV) with silver nitrate, which forms silver hexabromorhenite(IV), then this compound is heated to 600 °C to form rhenium(III) bromide.
K2ReBr6 + 2AgNO3 → Ag2ReBr6 + 2KNO3
6Ag2ReBr6 → 12AgBr + 3Br2 + 2Re3Br9

An alternative method is a thermal decomposition of rhenium(V) bromide.

References

Rhenium compounds
Bromides